Muzz is an American band based in New York City. The band consists of Paul Banks, Matt Barrick, and Josh Kaufman.

Background 
Paul Banks, Matt Barrick, and Josh Kaufman had all been friends that had been involved in the New York City post-punk revival scene of the early 2000s. The three began playing together in early 2015 which lead to the first demos of Muzz. In 2020, the band began recording studio material in anticipation of their self-titled debut album. This album was released on June 5, 2020.

Discography

Studio albums

Extended plays 
 "Covers" (December 9, 2020, Matador)

Singles 
 "Bad Feeling" (2020)
 "Broken Tambourine" (2020)
 "Red Western Sky" (2020)
 "Knuckleduster" (2020)

Band members 
 Paul Banks — vocals, guitar
 Matt Barrick — drums
 Josh Kaufman — guitar

References

External links 
 
 

2015 establishments in New York City
Indie rock musical groups from New York (state)
Matador Records artists
Musical groups established in 2015
Musical groups from New York City
Post-punk revival music groups
Rock music supergroups